Sushchyovo is a rural locality (a village) in Novoalexandrovskoye Rural Settlement, Suzdalsky District, Vladimir Oblast, Russia. The population was 61 as of 2010. There are 5 streets.

Geography 
Sushchyovo is located on the Rpen River, 36 km south of Suzdal (the district's administrative centre) by road. Bogolyubka is the nearest rural locality.

References 

Rural localities in Suzdalsky District